Grover is the name of some places in the U.S. state of Wisconsin:
Grover, Marinette County, Wisconsin, a town
Grover, Taylor County, Wisconsin, a town